Murray Dupuis (June 8, 1890 – May 16, 1926) was an American Negro league second baseman in the 1910s.

A native of Rulo, Nebraska, Dupuis played for the Indianapolis ABCs in 1913. In seven recorded games, he posted three hits in 27 plate appearances. Dupuis died in Brown County, Kansas in 2006 at age 79.

References

External links
 and Seamheads

1890 births
1926 deaths
Indianapolis ABCs players
Baseball second basemen
Baseball players from Nebraska
People from Richardson County, Nebraska
20th-century African-American sportspeople